The prevertebral muscles are the muscles located between the prevertebral fascia (older definition) and the vertebral column, i.e., the longus capitis, longus colli, rectus capitis anterior, and rectus capitis lateralis muscles.

See also
 Prevertebral space

References

Muscles of the head and neck